Kirby railway station was a railway station on the York and North Midland Railway's branch line to Pickering. Named after the village of Kirby Misperton, it opened in October 1845. It closed on 1 October 1858.

Some authorities refer to this station as "Black Bull or Kirby"Black Bull being a reference to the (much nearer) public house, which also gave its name to the nearby level crossing on the Pickering–Malton road.

The station house, which still stands, was built in stoneunusual for minor stations which were more commonly built in brick (as was nearby Marishes Road). Indeed, the Y&NM crossing keeper's house at the adjacent crossing was in brick.

The NER built a short terrace of four houses between the station building and Black Bull level crossing for platelayers and labourers.

References

Disused railway stations in North Yorkshire
Railway stations in Great Britain opened in 1845
Railway stations in Great Britain closed in 1858
Former York and North Midland Railway stations
George Townsend Andrews railway stations
Pickering, North Yorkshire